Maisonneuve is an English-language general interest magazine based in Montreal, Quebec, Canada. It publishes eclectic stories of national and international scope on the arts, culture, and politics.

History and profile
Established in 2002 by Derek Webster, the magazine is named after Paul de Chomedey de Maisonneuve, the founder of Montreal. It defines its mandate as "to dissolve artistic borders between regions, countries, languages, and genres". Drew Nelles served as the editor-in-chief of the magazine. Selena Ross is the current editor-in-chief.

Maisonneuve has won many awards for its writing, covers, illustration, and photojournalism. It was named Magazine of the Year in 2005, 2012, and 2016 (National Magazine Awards), Small Magazine of the Year in 2006 (Editors' Choice Awards), and Newsstand Magazine of the Year (Canadian Newsstand Awards) in 2007, among many other awards for individual features.

References

External links
 
 

2002 establishments in Quebec
Visual arts magazines published in Canada
Quarterly magazines published in Canada
English-language magazines
English-language mass media in Quebec
Magazines established in 2002
Magazines published in Montreal
Quebec Anglophone culture in Montreal